Atyria is a genus of moths in the family Geometridae.

Species
 Atyria albifrons Prout, 1916
 Atyria alcidamea (Druce, 1890)
 Atyria allogaster (Prout, 1918)
 Atyria basina (Boisduval, 1870)
 Atyria centralis (Dognin, 1911)
 Atyria chibcha (Schaus, 1892)
 Atyria circumdata (Maassen, 1890)
 Atyria commoda Prout, 1938
 Atyria compensata (Dognin, 1906)
 Atyria dichroa (Perty, 1833)
 Atyria dichroides Prout, 1916
 Atyria dubia (Schaus, 1892)
 Atyria durnfordi (Druce, 1899)
 Atyria fumosa Kohler, 1924
 Atyria gracillima (Warren, 1907)
 Atyria isis Hübner, 1823
 Atyria lemonia (Druce, 1890)
 Atyria limbata (Butler, 1873)
 Atyria matutina (Walker, 1865)
 Atyria mnemosyne Prout, 1916
 Atyria nanipennis (Warren, 1900)
 Atyria portis Prout, 1938
 Atyria quadriradiata (Weymer, 1901)
 Atyria quicha (Schaus, 1892)
 Atyria sciaulax Prout, 1938
 Atyria stenochora (Prout, 1918)
 Atyria subdichroa Dognin, 1900
 Atyria triradiata Prout, 1938
 Atyria velata (Druce, 1885)
 Atyria vespertina (Walker, [1865])
 Atyria volumnia (Druce, 1899)

References
 Atyria at Markku Savela's Lepidoptera and Some Other Life Forms

Cyllopodini
Geometridae genera